This is a list of episodes from the tenth season of Happy Days.

Main cast
 Henry Winkler as Arthur "Fonzie" Fonzarelli
 Marion Ross as Marion Cunningham
 Anson Williams as Warren "Potsie" Weber
 Cathy Silvers as Jenny Piccalo
 Ted McGinley as Roger Phillips 
 Linda Purl as Ashley Pfister
 Tom Bosley as Howard Cunningham

Guest stars
 Erin Moran as Joanie Cunningham
 Scott Baio as Chachi Arcola
 Crystal Bernard as K.C. Cunningham
 Billy Warlock as Flip Phillips
 Heather O'Rourke as Heather Pfister
 Pat Morita as Arnold
Scott Berenstein as Melvin Belvin
Harris Kal as Bobby
Kevin Sullivan as Tommy
Gary Friedkin as Clarence

Broadcast history
The season aired Tuesdays at 8:00-8:30 pm (EST).

Episodes

References

Happy Days 10
1982 American television seasons
1983 American television seasons